Keija C. Minor (born April 24, 1972) is an African-American magazine editor and former lawyer. From 2012 to 2017, she was editor-in-chief of Condé Nast weddings magazine Brides, becoming the first African-American to hold the editor-in-chief title at Condé Nast.

Early life
Minor grew up in Harvard, Massachusetts, and attended the University of Massachusetts-Amherst, then Howard University Law School, where she graduated in 1999.

Career
Minor practiced corporate law for four years before moving to magazines, first joining Travel Savvy where she eventually became editor-in-chief. She also worked for Los Angeles Confidential, then as editor-in-chief of Gotham from 2005 to 2007 and Uptown (2008 to 2011) before joining Condé Nast. Minor became executive editor of Brides, the world's largest weddings publication, in 2011, then acting editor-in-chief when previous editor-in-chief Anna Fulenwider moved to Marie Claire; the promotion became permanent in November 2012. This made Minor the first African-American to hold the editor-in-chief title in Condé Nast's then-103-year history. At Brides, Minor oversaw the expansion of the publication into commercial endeavors, including making editors from the magazine available for hire as private consultants to individual brides.

In 2013, The Grio named Minor to its Grio 100 list, citing her "breaking Conde Nast's color barrier at Brides."

Minor resigned from Condé Nast in 2017.

References

LinkedIn Profile

Living people
Condé Nast people
American magazine editors
Women magazine editors
People from Harvard, Massachusetts
University of Massachusetts Amherst alumni
Howard University School of Law alumni
1972 births